The Storm is a 1922 American silent northwoods melodrama film directed by Reginald Barker and starring Virginia Valli, Matt Moore, and House Peters. It was produced and distributed by Universal Pictures.

Plot
As described in a film magazine review, two men and a woman are snowed in together in a cabin in the Northwoods. One is a city man away for his health, the other a trapper. The young woman is the daughter of a French Canadian whose father had been killed by the North-West Mounted Police. Through the winter a silent bitter struggle develops between the men for the hand of the young woman which ends in the treachery of the city man being exposed and the trapper winning the affections of the young woman after a thrilling forest fire.

Cast

Preservation
Prints of The Storm are held at EYE Institut Filmmuseum and UCLA Film and Television Archive.

References

External links

Still at silenthollywood.com

1922 films
American silent feature films
Films directed by Reginald Barker
American films based on plays
Universal Pictures films
American black-and-white films
Melodrama films
Silent American drama films
1922 drama films
1920s American films